Waterwitch, water-witch, Water Witch, or variant, may refer to:

Ships
, a Confederate States Navy gunboat
, several Royal Navy vessels
, several United States Navy ships
Water Witch (schooner), an 1832 ship that sank in  Lake Champlain in 1866
Water Witch (1835 cutter), a cutter owned by the Government of South Australia
Water Witch (1835 steamer), a British Cross-Channel steam packet

Other uses
Waterwitch, New Jersey, an unincorporated community in Highlands, Monmouth County
The Water-Witch, an 1830 novel by James Fenimore Cooper
Water Witch (novel) a novel by Connie Willis and Cynthia Felice
Dowsing, divination to find ground water or other minerals
Pied-billed grebe, a species of waterfowl sometimes referred to as Water Witch

See also
 Witch (disambiguation)
 Water (disambiguation)